Gigasiphon is a genus of plants in the family Fabaceae. The genus is circumscribed is defined by "a long-tubular hypanthium, an arborescent habit, and a calyx divided into two lobes."

Species
Gigasiphon comprises the following species:

 Gigasiphon amplum (Span.) de Wit
 Gigasiphon dolichocalyx (Merr.) de Wit
 Gigasiphon humblotianum (Baill.) Drake
 Gigasiphon macrosiphon (Harms) Brenan
 Gigasiphon schlechteri (Harms) de Wit

Note:: Gigasiphon gossweileri is now in the African monotypic genus Tournaya

References

Cercidoideae
Fabaceae genera
Taxonomy articles created by Polbot
Fabales of Asia